An active-matrix liquid-crystal display (AMLCD) is a type of flat-panel display, the only viable technology for high-resolution TVs, computer monitors, notebook computers, tablet computers and smartphones with an LCD screen, due to low weight, very good image quality, wide color gamut and response time.

The concept of active-matrix LCDs was proposed by Bernard J. Lechner at the RCA Laboratories in 1968. The first functional AMLCD with thin-film transistors was made by T. Peter Brody, Fang-Chen Luo and their team at Westinghouse Electric Corporation in 1972. However, it took years of additional research and development by others to launch successful products.

Introduction

The most common type of AMLCD contains, besides the polarizing sheets and cells of liquid crystal, a matrix of thin-film transistors to make a thin-film-transistor liquid-crystal display. These devices store the electrical state of each pixel on the display while all the other pixels are being updated.  This method provides a much brighter, sharper display than a passive matrix of the same size. An important specification for these displays is their viewing-angle.

Thin-film transistors are usually used for constructing an active matrix so that the two terms are often interchanged, even though a thin-film transistor is just one component in an active matrix and some active-matrix designs have used other components such as diodes. Whereas a passive matrix display uses a simple conductive grid to apply a voltage to the liquid crystals in the target area, an active-matrix display uses a grid of transistors and capacitors with the ability to hold a charge for a limited period of time. Because of the switching action of transistors, only the desired pixel receives a charge, and the pixel acts as a capacitor to hold the charge until the next refresh cycle, improving image quality over a passive matrix. This is a special version of a sample-and-hold circuit.

See also 
 Organic light-emitting diode
 Active-matrix organic light-emitting diode
 Display resolution

References

External links 
Eduard Rhein Stiftung 1988 Technology Award Dr. T. Peter Brody: Basic development of TFT liquid crystal display

Liquid crystal displays